Deon Ryan Moore (born 14 May 1999) is an English professional footballer who plays as a forward for Lewes.

Club career
Born in the London Borough of Croydon, Moore started his career with the youth side at Carshalton Athletic in 2011 at under-13 age level, staying with the club four years until under-16 level. In the summer of 2015, he signed a two-year scholarship with Peterborough United. In August 2016, despite still a scholar he was promoted to the first team, making his debut as a 17-year-old in the 6–1 defeat to Norwich City U23 in the EFL Trophy, replacing Shaq Coulthirst as a substitute.

After spending time on trial at Sheffield Wednesday and Hull City, Moore joined Isthmian League side Merstham in March 2018.

Bristol Rovers
On 24 August 2018, Moore joined League One side Bristol Rovers, making his debut two months later as a late substitute in a 2–0 win over Yeovil Town in the EFL Trophy. On 16 November 2018, he joined National League South side Bath City on a one-month loan deal.

He was offered a new contract by Bristol Rovers at the end of the 2018–19 season and after a successful start to pre-season, signed an extension on 19 July 2019.

Hemel Hempstead Town
In January 2020, Moore joined National League South side Hemel Hempstead Town, making his debut on 7 January against Chippenham Town.

Dulwich Hamlet
Moore joined National League South side Dulwich Hamlet ahead of the start of the 2020-21 season, making his debut against Corinthian-Casuals in the FA Cup 2nd Qualifying Round on 5 October 2020, scoring an 88th minute equaliser as Dulwich Hamlet won on penalties. In October 2021, he joined Isthmian League Premier Division side Lewes on a one-month loan deal. He made six appearances in all competitions during his loan spell. On 27 November 2021, Moore moved on loan to again to fellow Isthmian League Premier Division side Carshalton Athletic. On 19 March 2022, Moore was loaned to Chelmsford City.

Lewes
On 10 August 2022, Moore returned to Lewes on a permanent basis having previously spent time with the club on loan.

Career statistics

References

External links

1999 births
Living people
Footballers from the London Borough of Croydon
Association football forwards
English footballers
English Football League players
Peterborough United F.C. players
Merstham F.C. players
Bristol Rovers F.C. players
Bath City F.C. players
Billericay Town F.C. players
Hemel Hempstead Town F.C. players
Dulwich Hamlet F.C. players
Lewes F.C. players
Carshalton Athletic F.C. players
Chelmsford City F.C. players
National League (English football) players
Isthmian League players